Pout is a town with commune status in Thiès Department in Thiès Region of Senegal. Its population in 2013 was 23,728.  It stands on the side of the N2 road, giving easy access to the large towns of Dakar and Saint-Louis.

The town, in an area traditionally peopled by Sereer, has developed rapidly as a result of industrialisation. It was made a commune de ville in 1990.

Surrounded by forest, it is also a vegetable and fruit growing area where mangos, mandarins and oranges are produced. The industrial activity includes agricultural machine fabrication, salt and cement production and the export offruit and vegetables.

References

 Partly based on the article in French Wikipedia

Populated places in Thiès Region
Communes of Senegal